Baoning Temple, may refer to:

 Baoning Temple (Changsha), Buddhist temple in Yuelu District of Changsha, Hunan

 , Buddhist temple in Youyu County, Shuozhou, Shanxi

 Madou Daitian Temple, also known as Baoning Temple, a temple in Nanshi Village, Madou District, Tainan, Taiwan

Buddhist temple disambiguation pages